The Arrol Gantry was a large steel structure built by Sir William Arrol & Co. at the Harland and Wolff shipyard in Belfast, Ireland. It was built to act as overhead cranes for the building of the three Olympic-class liners.

Beardmore's gantry at Dalmuir 
From 1900 to 1906, Arrol had constructed a shipyard for William Beardmore and Company at Dalmuir on the Clyde. This included a large gantry structure over the building berth. In 1906 it was used for the construction of the pre-dreadnought battleship , then the largest battleship launched on the Clyde.

The structure was of two long steel truss girders, supported on ten pairs of steel truss towers, braced by cross trusses above. Nine electric cranes were provided, with four jib cranes along each side girder, each having a 5-ton capacity and 30 foot jib. These were travelling cranes and could be moved along the girder, or grouped together to share a heavier lift. They were intended to place the main hull plates into position, with a dedicated gang for each crane, forming the plates and riveting them into place. A central 15 ton travelling gantry crane was also provided, for lifting machinery along the centreline of the hull.

The central girder between the berths allowed the addition of a larger cantilever crane.

The Beardmore gantry had used tapered towers, with size and strength proportional to the load upon them. The base of each was spread into a triangular arch, giving a more stable base and also allowing a railway line to be laid through the towers, bringing construction materials.  For the Belfast gantry, the towers because more parallel, with straight inner faces. This allowed temporary working platforms to be attached and relocated upwards as a hull was constructed, giving an additional working space and easy access to the outside of the hull, even with heavy equipment. The access within the gantry was also improved, with long sloping walkways and electric lifts, rather than the previous slow and hazardous use of ladders.

Construction 

The Belfast gantry was commissioned by the White Star Line and Harland and Wolff and built by Sir William Arrol & Co. in 1908. It was  feet long,  feet wide and  feet high.

Before the Gantry, the northern end of the Queen's Island shipyard had four building slipways, each with gantry cranes above them. The cranes formed three crosswise gantries over each slip, with jib cranes working from each upright. To make space for the two new slipways, three of the old slipways were given up. The two new slipways were numbered 2 & 3. There were nine slipways at Queen's Island before this, eight afterwards but the other remained numbered as 5...9 and there was no longer a No 4 slipway.

The large girders provided runways for a pair of 10-ton overhead cranes above each way and lighter 5-ton jib cranes from the sides. Along the centre line ran a light Titan crane, with a reach of 135 feet and able to carry a 3-ton load at full radius, and 5 tons closer in. The cranes were electrically-powered and built by Stothert & Pitt of Bath. Access to the high girders was provided by three long ramps and also electric lifts for the shipyard workers. As Harland and Wolff were primarily a commercial yard, there was no need for the huge Titan cranes being built at this time for the naval shipyards of the Clyde, where heavy lifts of armour plate, or even entire turrets, were needed.

Olympic-class liners 

Olympic and Titanic were built together, with Olympic in the No 2 slipway. Olympic was launched first, in October 1910, with Titanic seven months later. To provide better photographs against the steelwork of the gantry, Olympic's hull was painted white during building, then repainted after launch. Titanic was painted in White Star's black hull livery from the outset.  was then constructed on the Olympic ways.

World War I 
At the outbreak of World War I, Harland and Wolff were still engaged in building passenger liners and the Belgian Red Star Line's 27,000 ton  was almost completed on the adjacent No 1 way.  had been launched from the No 2 way in July, a fortnight before the outbreak of war. A further liner, yard number 470, had been laid down there, but work had hardly started.

14 inch monitors 
When the Royal Navy wished to build the 14 inch monitors as coastal bombardment ships, these building ways were the most immediately available. This would require equally wide building slips, which the Olympic slips could provide. The monitors were so short that the first two of them, Admiral Farragut and General Grant, could be built simultaneously on the same slipway. Farragut was launched on 15 April 1915, with Grant following on 29 April. The limited lifting capacity of the gantry's cranes required the 4-inch armour plate to be installed in particularly small pieces, compared to in a warship building yard. To install their US-supplied turrets, the hulls were taken to the COW yard on the Clyde.

12 inch monitors 
A second group of monitors was also built. These were the 12 inch monitors and used guns taken from Majestic-class pre-dreadnought battleships. Although their 12-inch guns were now quite old, they had been sufficiently advanced over other guns at the time that they were still worth re-using. They had been the first British battleship main guns to use wire-wound construction and also the first to fire cordite propelling charges. Eight of these monitors were built, five by Harland and Wolff and four of them on slips 1 and 3 of the Queen's Island yard. Like the 14 inch monitors, these monitors had prominent anti-torpedo bulges to their hulls and required a wide building slip, but were short enough that two could be built simultaneously on the large liner slips.

Glorious 
 was laid down as a 'large, light cruiser' on 1 May 1915 and launched almost a year later on 20 April 1916.

A class of small 6 inch gun-armed monitors was also designed, to use the secondary armament removed from the Queen Elizabeth battleships. As the 14-inch monitors were now almost complete, it was hoped to build this whole class of five on a single large slipway. However the number 2 slipway was needed immediately for Glorious. Slipway 5, at the southern end of Queen's Island, was used instead to build three of them, working around the keel of the postponed , and the other two at the Workman, Clark yard across the water.

Terror 
A second batch of 15 inch-armed monitors were built, with a more developed design than the earlier Marshals. Ney's turret was removed at Elswick and the mount converted for greater elevation, then shipped to Belfast for installation by Harland and Wolff's floating crane.

Both of these monitors had a successful WWI career and served into WWII.

Berth plan

Disuse 
The Gantry was in use into the 1960s, but the shipyard was then reorganised to provide a larger building space. Work on large ships then took place in a large dry dock at the end of the Musgrave channel on the south-eastern side of Queen's Island, served by a pair of Goliath cranes, Samson and Goliath.

In popular culture 
The Gantry dominated the skyline of Belfast and became an important local landmark, as Samson and Goliath would do again fifty years later. The poet 
Louis MacNeice's autobiographical poem Carrickfergus describes his birthplace:
"I was born in Belfast between the mountain and the gantries
    To the hooting of lost sirens and the clang of trams:"
This is somewhat anachronistic, as MacNeice was born just before the construction of the Gantry and his family had moved to nearby Carrickfergus before Olympic's launch.

Notes

References

History of Belfast
Cranes (machines)
RMS Titanic